Central High School is a high school in Rapid City, South Dakota.  The principal is Mike Talley.  The high school mascot is the Cobbler.  The nickname was changed from "Tigers" to "Cobblers" to honor the South Dakota Hall of Fame Coach, Euclid N. "Euc" Cobb.

Central teams compete in the Greater Dakota Conference, with teams from Spearfish, Sturgis, Rapid City Stevens, and Sioux Falls schools.
Central High School moved from its original location south of downtown, to north of downtown and just west of the Rushmore Plaza Civic Center in 1978. The original location was renovated and opened in the fall of 2013 as Rapid City High School again. United States President Calvin Coolidge made his announcement that he would not run for the presidency in 1927 from the old campus.

Notable alumni
John Dutton- NFL Pro Bowl defensive lineman.
Adam Vinatieri- four-time Super Bowl-winning NFL placekicker for the New England Patriots and Indianapolis Colts
Emily Graslie - American science communicator and YouTube educator
Tomi Lahren- conservative online talk show host for TheBlaze
Camren Ritter- American youth national hockey player for team South Dakota
Colton Merchen- American youth national hockey player for team South Dakota

References

External links
Official web site
SDHSAA school info
Rapid City Central High School Cobblers

Public high schools in South Dakota
Education in Rapid City, South Dakota
Schools in Pennington County, South Dakota
Buildings and structures in Rapid City, South Dakota
Educational institutions with year of establishment missing